Acastella is an extinct genus of trilobite. The genus contains six species being  A. herberti, A. jacquemonty, A. prima, A. roualti, A. tanzidensis and A. tiro.

References

External links
 Acastella at the Paleobiology Database

Silurian trilobites
Acastidae
Fossils of Algeria
Silurian first appearances
Early Devonian genus extinctions